Swiss Precision Diagnostics GmbH is a Swiss medical diagnostic company, that produces Clearblue-branded pregnancy testing equipment.

History
The company was formed as a 50/50 joint venture (JV) between Alere (concerning the division Unipath, which had been acquired from Unilever) and P&G. It was formed on 17 May 2007. Abbott Laboratories acquired Alere in 2017.

Hilde Eylenbosch was the first Chief Executive of the company.

Structure
It is based in Geneva, in offices of P&G. It is a business member of the British-based Institute of Bio-Sensing Technology.

Products
It makes medical diagnostic kits (biosensors).
 Accu-Clear
 Clearblue
 Persona

See also
 :Category:Tests for pregnancy

References

External links
 SPD

Manufacturing companies based in Geneva
Health care companies of Switzerland
Joint ventures
Manufacturing companies established in 2007
Procter & Gamble
Swiss companies established in 2007